PLS Logistics Service (PLS), founded in 1991, is an American third-party logistics provider in the metal, lumber, and building industries. Headquartered in Cranberry Township, Pennsylvania, a suburb of Pittsburgh, PLS Logistics Services provides freight transportation, logistics, and technology services for businesses. PLS serves a variety of companies, including suppliers, producers, wholesalers, service centers, and end-users.  

PLS manages more than 1 million loads annually throughout the U.S., Canada, and Mexico via all major freight modes: full truckload, LTL, rail, barge, air, ocean, and intermodal.

History   
PLS was founded in 1991 as Pittsburgh Logistics Systems to transport steel for industrial companies. Later renamed PLS Logistics Services, the company has expanded its services to many other industries yet remains the largest industrial-focused 3PL.

Operations 
PLS’s transportation options include less than truckload (LTL), full truckload (FTL), rail, air, ocean, intermodal, refrigerated, flatbed, specialized and oversized loads, and expedited shipping services. On average, PLS Logistics moves 3,000 shipments daily in North America.

Industries   
PLS Logistics originally started in the metal and mining industries, supporting the need of the steel industry in Pittsburgh, Pennsylvania. They have since expanded into retail, food and beverage, consumer packaged goods (CPG), oil and gas, heavy haul, building, and construction industries. PLS Logistics also has experience transporting military supplies and government freight.

References

Logistics companies of the United States
Companies based in Pittsburgh
American companies established in 1991
Transport companies established in 1991
Transportation companies based in Pennsylvania